Salterbarty Tales is the debut album by the American electronic band Earthstar. It was recorded in 1977 and 1978 and released by Moontower Records in 1978.  The album is the only release to feature significant grand piano sections performed by Craig Wuest with relatively basic synthesizer work and far less multitracking when compared to later Earthstar albums.  It is also the only album not to feature tape loop instruments:  the mellotron and the Birotron.

Salterbarty Tales has never been reissued and has been described as "impossible to find" by Earthstar guitarist Dennis Rea.  A few copies sold online in 2007 ranged in price from US $75 to US $125.

Track listing
Side A
Splendored Skies and Angels – 5:48
Serindego – 9:11(including Rapid of HU)
Salterbarty Overture – 3:03
Wee Voices Touch - 1:32
Broken Chain of Euphoria – 8:30

Side B
Canyon Nebula – 22:10(including Rapter Relcafe, Sunspots Theme, Rapter Releafe Reprise - Final.)
Night Tones – 5:15
Sunsets – 1:14
Shades – 1:02

Personnel
Craig Wuest – piano, synthesizers
Dennis Rea – guitar
Daryl Trivieri – violin
Norm Peach – bass
Daniel Zongrone – percussion
Tim Finnegan – flute

Notes

References
 Discogs Salterbarty Tales.  Retrieved July 12, 2008.
 Rea, Dennis, and uncredited contributors. New Gibraltar Encyclopedia of Progressive Rock.  Retrieved August 20, 2007.

1978 debut albums
Earthstar (band) albums